Konstantin Chaykin (born 1975) is a Russian watchmaker and inventor. He started as an independent watchmaker in 2003, establishing a workshop in St. Petersburg, Russia. In the interests of the business, in 2012 he transferred production to Moscow, Russia, where his company currently resides. He completed his first clock in 2004,. and in 2008 Académie Horlogère des Créateurs Indépendants (AHCI, English: "Academy of Independent Creators in Watchmaking") accepted him as a candidate. Since 2010 he has been a member of the AHCI (the only such member from Russia), while in 2016 he was elected by AHCI members as the President, a position held until 2019. In October 2022, the jury of the Temporis International Awards included Konstantin Chaikin in the Temporis Hall of Fame.

Inventions
Konstantin Chaykin’s first patent, RU2306618, granted to him in January 2007, protects the design of an Orthodox Easter date indicator. That has been followed by numerous other inventions, and as of May 2021, he owns 89 patents. In April 2020, the World Intellectual Property Organization (WIPO) through an application of the Federal Service for Intellectual Property (Russia) (Rospatent) awarded Konstantin Chaykin the WIPO Medal for Inventors for his contribution in the field of Technical Sciences in the Russian Federation. As of February 2023, the number of his patents has increased to 94.

Complicated clocks
In 2003–2004, he built his first clock – the Foundation tourbillon clock, the first of its kind in Russia. He is the creator of several notable complicated astronomical table clocks, including four Orthodox computus clocks – the Easter of Christ Computus Clock (2005), Resurrection Computus Clock (2007), Northern Computus Clock (2015) and Moscow Computus Clock (2016), all developed based on his patents. The Moscow Computus Clock, with 27 complications and mechanisms, 2,506 movement parts, four dials and over 2,500 components in the case, is regarded as the most complicated clock ever created in Russia.

Wristwatches
Konstantin Chaykin produces handcrafted wristwatches based on his patents and designs, including the Lunokhod with a large spherical moonphase indicator (2011), Levitas gentlemen’s and ladies’ watches, with transparent mysterious dials (2013), timepieces with traditional calendars – including those based on the Jewish (Decalogue collection) and Islamic (Hijra collection) calendars; the mechanical cinematograph Cinema watch (2013), the Genius Temporis watch able to display hours and minutes using a single hand (2014), and other notable timepieces. In 2017, with the Joker watch, he launched the Wristmons (Monsters on the Wrist) collection. In 2018, with the Clown Wristmon watch, Chaykin won the Audacity prize of the Grand Prix d’Horlogerie de Genève (GPHG). His Joker Selfie piece unique sold for 70,000 Swiss francs from an estimate of 18,000–24,000 francs on November 9, 2019, at the Only Watch 2019 charity auction held in Geneva by Christie’s.
Recently he has developed timepieces with a Mars time and other cosmic functions, the Mars Conqueror Mk1 (2018) and Mars Conqueror Mk3 Fighter (2020). November 6, 2021, Christie’s held in Geneva an auction Only Watch 2021, the unique Martian Tourbillon wristwatch, made by Konstantin Chaykin for charity was sold for 290,000 Swiss francs from an estimate of 40,000–60,000 francs. It is the first wristwatch from the Russian watchmaker to have a tourbillon, and the world’s first Martian tourbillon, making a revolution every 61.65 seconds – the duration of one Mars minute

301522 Chaykin asteroid
Leonid Elenin, a Russian amateur astronomer, best known for discovering five comets, and more than 500 asteroid, gave the name “Chaykin” to the asteroid 301522 (2009 FX23), which he discovered on March 22, 2009 . International Astronomical Union confirmed the name in an official publication. 301522 Chaykin asteroid located in the main asteroid belt, its diameter is approximately 3.528 km, and the period is 2041.64 days (5.59 years).

Notes

References 
Steve Huyton. “Independent Watchmakers.” 2019. Suffolk, UK: Acc Art Books. ISBN 978-1851498987
Olivier Muller. “AHCI – The Independent Spirit: Time Makers Since 1985.” 2020. Lutry, Switzerland: Watchprint.Com Sarl. ISBN 978-2940506378
Kutkovoy Alexey. “Konstantin Chaykin: Haute horlogerie, with Russian soul.” 2021. Moscow, Russia: August Borg. ISBN 978-5-901053-83-6
“Konstantin Chaykin” documentary by Aleksey Dovgulya, Russian filmmaker and photographer. 2021
Elizabeth Doerr. The Konstantin Chaykin Joker Dracula Watch: Its Fangs Come Out Only At Night. 2018-10-31, forbes.com 
Sean Lorentzen. Konstantin Chaykin Announces Limited-Edition Minotaur Watch. 2021-02-12, ablogtowatch.com
Rob Nudds. A Bullish New Wristmon From Konstantin Chaykin Celebrates The Year Of The Ox. 2021-02-12, fratellowatches.com

Watch manufacturing companies of Russia
Watchmakers (people)
1975 births
Businesspeople from Saint Petersburg
Russian inventors
Living people